Saint-Pierre-de-Trivisy (Languedocien: Sent Pèire de Trevesi) is a commune in the Tarn department in southern France.

Geography
Its population in 2018 was 621.

See also
Communes of the Tarn department

References

Communes of Tarn (department)